The DePaul Blue Demons men's basketball program is the NCAA Division I intercollegiate men's basketball program of DePaul University in Chicago, Illinois. The team competes in the Big East Conference.

The Blue Demons play home games at Wintrust Arena at the McCormick Place convention center on Chicago's Near South Side.

History

DePaul was an independent from 1923 to 1991. It joined the Great Midwest Conference in 1991 which later merged with the Metro Conference in 1995 to become Conference USA, in which DePaul was a member through 2005. DePaul left for the Big East Conference in 2005 and was a member until 2012 when it joined the reconfigured Big East in 2013.

Early history (1923–1942)
Robert L. Stevenson was the first head coach in DePaul basketball history. In his one season as coach during the 1923–24 season, he coached the Blue Demons to a record of 8–6. Harry Adams was head coach for the 1924–25 season and finished with a record of 6–13. Eddie Anderson was head coach from 1925 to 1929 and compiled an overall record of 37–26.

In 1929, Jim Kelly became head coach at DePaul where he compiled a record of 99–22 in his 7 seasons as coach before leaving in 1936. Tom Haggerty coached DePaul from 1936 to 1940 and compiled an overall record of 63–32. Bill Wendt coached DePaul for 2 seasons from 1940 to 1941 and had a record of 23–20.

Ray Meyer era (1942–1984)
Naismith Memorial Basketball Hall of Fame head coach Ray Meyer coached at DePaul for 42 years from 1942 to 1984 and finished with an overall 724–354 record (.672). He coached his team's to 21 post-season appearances (13 NCAA, eight NIT). Meyer led his teams to two Final Four appearances in the 1943 NCAA basketball tournament and 1979 NCAA Division I basketball tournament. Meyer's 1943 Final Four appearance was his first season coaching DePaul. His teams were a No. 1 seed in its NCAA regional three years in a row in 1980, 1981 and 1982. Meyer led DePaul past Bowling Green to capture the 1945 National Invitation Tournament, the school's only post-season title. In total, Meyer recorded 37 winning seasons and twelve 20-win seasons, including seven straight from 1978 to 1984.

Meyer coached George Mikan who was inducted into the Naismith Memorial Basketball Hall of Fame in 1959, made the 25th and 35th NBA Anniversary Teams of 1970 and 1980, and was elected one of the NBA's 50 Greatest Players ever in 1996. Meyer also coached the 1980 Naismith College Player of the Year, Mark Aguirre.

During Ray Meyer's tenure, the Blue Demons originally played in University Auditorium before moving to Alumni Hall in 1956. For the start of the 1980 season, DePaul men's basketball moved to the Rosemont Horizon later renamed Allstate Arena.

Joey Meyer era (1984–1997)
Joey Meyer was head coach of DePaul from 1984 to 1997 compiling an overall record of 231–158. He started as an assistant coach at DePaul for eleven seasons under his father, Ray Meyer. When Ray Meyer retired in 1984, Joey Meyer was promoted to head coach.

Joey Meyer led DePaul to seven NCAA Tournament appearances in his first eight seasons, including back-to-back Sweet Sixteen appearances in his second and third seasons. In the 1986 tournament, #12-seeded DePaul—led by freshman guard Rod Strickland (14.1 ppg season average) and junior Dallas Comegys (13.8 ppg) -- upset #5-seeded Virginia and #4-seeded Oklahoma in the East regional before losing to top-seeded Duke 74–67. In 1987, the Blue Demons—again led by Comegys (17.5 ppg) and Strickland (16.3 ppg) -- finished the regular season 26–2 and received a #3 seed in the Midwest regional of the 1987 tournament. They defeated #14-seeded Louisiana Tech and #6-seeded St. John's before losing to #10-seeded LSU. Meyer was honored as the Chevrolet Coach of the Year in 1987. Besides seven NCAA tournament appearances, Meyer led the Blue Demons to three appearances in the National Invitation Tournament.

In both 1988 and 1989, DePaul reached the second round of the NCAA tournament, but they were on a downward trajectory. In 1992, the Blue Demons were co-champions of the newly formed Great Midwest Conference but made their last NCAA tournament appearance under Meyer. In 1996, they finished 11–18, their first losing season since 1971, and the next year, a young DePaul team finished 3–23. Meyer was dismissed on April 28, 1997.

Pat Kennedy era (1997–2002)
Pat Kennedy was named head coach after Joey Meyer. It was the first time a member of the Meyer family hadn't coached DePaul basketball in 55 years. Kennedy coached DePaul from 1997 to 2002 and finished with an overall record of 67–85.

Dave Leitao era – First tenure (2002–2005)
Dave Leitao was named head coach at DePaul for the 2002–03 season. His teams made post-season play in all three of his seasons as head coach. In his second season, his team advanced to the second round of the 2004 NCAA tournament before being eliminated by eventual national champion Connecticut. His teams also played in the 2003 and 2005 NIT Tournaments. In his first stint as head coach at Depaul, he finished with a 58–34 overall record. Leitao left to become the head coach at the University of Virginia in 2005.

Jerry Wainwright era (2005–2010)
Jerry Wainwright was named DePaul head coach in 2005. In his first season he finished with a 12–15 record. In his second season in 2006–07, the Blue Demons beat #5 Kansas, pulling off one of the greatest upsets in school history. They also beat 2006 NCAA tournament teams California, Northwestern State, Marquette, Connecticut and Villanova with Wainwright leading the Blue Demons to the 2007 National Invitation Tournament quarterfinals before losing to Air Force. Four games into the 2007–08 season, Wainwright logged his 200th career win as a head coach, but the team finished with a 10–19 record. The 2008–2009 season saw DePaul finish 9–24 overall and 0–18 in regular season Big East play. Wainwright began the 2009–10 season as head coach, but was fired on January 11, 2010 after a 7–8 start to the season. He still had two years remaining on his contract at the time of his firing. Wainwright finished with a 59–80 overall record in his five years at DePaul. Assistant coach Tracy Webster was named interim head coach for the remainder of the 2009–10 season and finished with a 1–15 record.

Oliver Purnell era (2010–2015)
On April 6, 2010, Oliver Purnell, formerly of Clemson University signed a seven-year deal with DePaul. In his first season in 2010–11, Purnell finished with a record of 7–24. The rest of his tenure saw his teams with finish with similar records of 12–19 during the 2011–2012 season, 11–21 during the 2012–2013 season, 12–21 during the 2013–2014 season and 12–20 in 2014–15. At the conclusion of the 2014–2015 season, Purnell announced his resignation. He finished with an overall record of 54–105 at DePaul.

Dave Leitao era – Second tenure (2015–2021)
Dave Leitao returned for his second stint as DePaul head basketball coach for the 2015–2016 season. The team finished with a record of 9–22 in his first season back with the Blue Demons. The 2016–2017 season saw the Blue Demons finish with a 9–23 record in Leitao's second season. This season would be DePaul's last season playing at Allstate Arena in Rosemont, Illinois after 37 years at the venue. For the 2017–2018 season, the Blue Demons moved back to Chicago to play their home games at 10,387-seat Wintrust Arena at the McCormick Place convention center. The first season at Wintrust Arena saw the Blue Demons return to double-digit wins finishing with a record of 11–20 in Leitao's third season.

Following the 2017–2018 season, DePaul's eleventh straight losing season under coaches hired by current Athletic Director Jean Lenti Ponsetto, a group of "concerned students and alumni" purchased a full page advertisement in the Chicago Sun-Times calling for change within the school's Athletic Department. Additional reasons the students and alumni wanted change was that since the 1989–90 season, DePaul had won only one NCAA tournament game in the 29 seasons that transpired. DePaul had also only been to two NCAA Tournaments since the 1991–92 season, hadn't qualified for the NCAA Tournament since the 2003–04 season and the Blue Demons had not made postseason play since 2006–07. Additionally, DePaul finished last in the Big East eight out of the past ten seasons including a tie for last place during the 2017–18 season.

The 2018–2019 season saw a turnaround for DePaul as the Blue Demons finished with a 19–17 overall record. In Leitao's fourth season, he led the Blue Demons to the 2019 College Basketball Invitational post-season tournament. The team finished as runner-up to the University of South Florida Bulls. In the Best of Three Championship series, DePaul beat South Florida in game 2, but dropped games one and three to the Bulls to give DePaul a second-place finish in the tournament.

Tony Stubblefield era – (2021–present)
On April 1, 2021, Tony Stubblefield was hired as head coach. He previously served as an assistant coach at  Oregon.

Championships

Final Fours
DePaul has played in two Final Fours in the NCAA Division I men's basketball tournament. The Blue Demons are 0–2 all-time in the Final Four.

NIT Championships
DePaul has won one National Invitation Tournament (NIT) championship.

Conference championships
DePaul has won a total of two conference championships since leaving independent status following the 1990–91 season.

Postseason

NCAA tournament results
The Blue Demons have appeared in the NCAA tournament 22 times. Their combined record is 21–25, although the NCAA vacated their appearances from 1986 to 1989, thereby making their record officially 15–21.

* Vacated by the NCAA

NIT results
The Blue Demons have appeared in the National Invitation Tournament (NIT) 16 times. Their combined record is 17–17. They were NIT Champions in 1945.

CBI results
The Blue Demons have appeared in the College Basketball Invitational (CBI) one time. Their record is 4–2.

Honors

Naismith Memorial Basketball Hall of Fame

Retired numbers 
DePaul has retired two jersey numbers.

National Player of the Year

National Coach of the Year
DePaul has had two of their coaches awarded the National Coach of the Year, done on five occasions.

Professional players
The following former DePaul Blue Demons have played in the NBA or original ABA:

Mark Aguirre
Andre Brown
Stanley Brundy
Em Bryant
Howie Carl
Wilson Chandler
Dallas Comegys
Tyrone Corbin
Dave Corzine
Terry Cummings
Gene Dyker
Kevin Edwards
Ron Feiereisel
Elmer Gainer
Gary Garland
Billy Garrett Jr.
Bato Govedarica
Myke Henry
Stephen Howard
Steven Hunter
Johnny Jorgensen
Whitey Kachan
Paul McPherson
Ed Mikan
George Mikan
Errol Palmer
Jack Phelan
Paul Reed
Quentin Richardson
Bill Robinzine
Bobby Simmons
Ron Sobieszczyk
Rod Strickland
Gene Stump
Max Strus
Dick Triptow

The following former DePaul Blue Demons have played professionally in leagues outside of the United States:

David Booth
Tom Kleinschmidt
Draelon Burns
Worrell Clahar
Cliff Clinkscales
Drake Diener
Marty Embry
Kevin Holmes
Sammy Mejía
Brandon Young

Arenas

Wintrust Arena

Wintrust Arena is a 10,387-seat multi-purpose sports venue in Chicago. The arena opened in 2017 and is home of the DePaul Blue Demons men's basketball team.

Allstate Arena

Allstate Arena, formerly the Rosemont Horizon, opened in 1980 and was home of the DePaul men's basketball team from its opening until 2017. The arena sat 17,500 people for basketball.

Alumni Hall

Alumni Hall was completed in 1956 and was the on-campus home venue of the DePaul Blue Demons men's basketball team through 1980 when the Rosemont Horizon opened.

University Auditorium

University Auditorium, nicknamed "The Barn", was the original on-campus home gymnasium for DePaul men's basketball starting in 1923 until 1956.

Alternate arenas
McGrath-Phillips Arena, located in the Sullivan Athletic Center, was the home venue for select on-campus games for the men's basketball team from 2000 until 2017. The venue also hosted DePaul men's basketball games during the 2007 National Invitation Tournament and 2019 College Basketball Invitational Tournament.

Chicago Stadium was the home of college basketball doubleheaders involving the DePaul men's basketball team in the 1940s and 1950s.

Practice and Training facilities
McGrath-Phillips Arena is the practice facility for the DePaul Blue Demons men's basketball team. The facility is located in the Sullivan Athletic Center, which was completed in 2000.

Head coaches

Footnotes

References

External links